The Song Remains the Same is the live soundtrack album of the concert film of the same name by the English rock band Led Zeppelin. The soundtrack was recorded 27–29 July 1973 and released on 28 September 1976 on Swan Song Records.

Overview
The recording of the album and the film took place during three nights of concerts at New York's Madison Square Garden, during the band's 1973 North American tour. All songs were recorded by Eddie Kramer using the Wally Heider Mobile Studio truck, and later mixed at Electric Lady Studios in New York and Trident Studios in London.

The sleeve design depicts a dilapidated movie house on Old Street film studios in London, where the group rehearsed for their 1973 tour.

Until the album and the film were remastered and re-released in 2007, they featured slightly different track lists:

The soundtrack album included "Celebration Day", which did not appear in the film. The album did not include several songs featured in the film, including "Black Dog", "Since I've Been Loving You", "Heartbreaker", the instrumental "Bron-Yr-Aur" (which appeared on Physical Graffiti), and a hurdy-gurdy piece called "Autumn Lake".

In addition, some of the recordings featured on the album were of different performances from those in the film. 

Some tracks recorded at Madison Square Garden were omitted from both the film and the soundtrack album: "Over the Hills and Far Away", "Misty Mountain Hop", "The Ocean",  and "Thank You".

2007 reissue
The surviving band members oversaw the remixing and remastering of the original release, and The Song Remains the Same soundtrack album was reissued on CD on 20 November 2007. This coincided with the re-issue of the film, released on HD-DVD, Blu-ray and DVD. The new version of the soundtrack included six songs that were not on the original album release: "Black Dog", "Over the Hills and Far Away", "Misty Mountain Hop", "Since I've Been Loving You", "The Ocean" and "Heartbreaker", plus new liner notes by Cameron Crowe.

With the 2007 re-release of both the album and film, the songs were synchronised so that the full set-list from the concerts was available on both, with each song mixed the same way. Kevin Shirley, who worked on How The West Was Won, was involved in the mixing.

Due to legal complications, the band decided not to change the video portion of the original movie for the re-release. Instead, Shirley created an entirely new mix of the three 1973 Madison Square Garden concerts so that the audio portion of the film would better match the on-screen visuals. The audio on the new CD release was nearly identical to the soundtrack of the new DVD release. One difference was that the songs included on the CDs that were not featured in the original movie were included as bonus tracks on the DVD.

The audio mixes also differed from those found on the 2003 Led Zeppelin DVD. The most obvious example is that "Black Dog" was two minutes longer on the 2003 DVD than on the 2007 releases,  two of the four verses being cut from the song.

On 29 July 2008, a four-LP edition of the 2007 re-issue, on 180 gram audiophile vinyl, was released. It was presented in a deluxe archival two-piece box with foil-stamping. It includes a 12-page oversized full-color booklet with dozens of previously unpublished stills from the film, as well as four individual jackets with new and unique artwork. A special white vinyl edition was also printed in very limited numbers. Just 200 were produced, with only 100 being made available to the public from Led Zeppelin's official website.

2018 reissue 
On 7 September 2018, a newly remastered edition of The Song Remains the Same was issued in multiple formats, including a multi-disc, super deluxe boxed set, Blu-ray audio with a hi-resolution stereo and new 5.1 surround mix, 180-gram vinyl, CD, streaming and downloads, including 24-bit/96k hi-res audio files for the first time. This is based on the 2007 version of the soundtrack album and concludes the campaign of reissues of their live albums and deluxe editions of their studio albums that started in 2014.

Critical reception 

Upon its initial release in 1976, the album received some mixed reviews, with a number of critics considering it to be over-produced and lumbering. Indeed, the band's members themselves have since expressed a lack of fondness for the recording. Page has admitted that the end product was not the best representation of Led Zeppelin as a live band.

In contrast, the 2007 reissued version received generally much more positive reviews. In a review published in Mojo magazine in December 2007 James McNair gave the album four out of five stars, as did David Cavanagh in Uncut magazine, who wrote:

Track listing

Original release

2007 reissue

Track 3 features "Bring It On Home" intro

Notes
 (*) Not on original soundtrack release
 (#) Shorter than the original soundtrack release
 (+) Longer than the original soundtrack release

Personnel
Led Zeppelin

Robert Plant – vocals
Jimmy Page – guitars,  Theremin
John Paul Jones – bass guitar, Fender Rhodes, Mellotron
John Bonham – drums, percussion, backing vocals

Production

Barry Diament – mastering (original Compact Disc release)
Peter Grant – executive producer
Eddie Kramer – engineering, mixing
Bob Ludwig – remastering (2007 edition)
Jimmy Page – production
Kevin Shirley – remixing (2007 edition)

Packaging

 Cameron Crowe – liner notes
 George Hardie – record sleeve
 Hipgnosis – record sleeve

Charts

Certifications

References

External links
 
 The Garden Tapes – a study of sources of the live material and the edits for release on this album.

Albums produced by Jimmy Page
Albums with cover art by Hipgnosis
Led Zeppelin live albums
1976 live albums
1976 soundtrack albums
Concert film soundtracks
Swan Song Records live albums
Swan Song Records soundtracks
Albums recorded at Madison Square Garden
Albums recorded at Trident Studios
Albums recorded at Electric Lady Studios
Hard rock soundtracks
Heavy metal soundtracks